The Peary Arctic Club was an American-based club with the goal of promoting the Arctic expeditions of Robert Peary (1856–1920).

This association of influential persons was able to overcome the opposition of the U.S. Navy Department to grant the indispensable five–year leave for Peary's 1898 Arctic expedition.

History
The Peary Arctic Club was founded in New York City in 1898 by a group of wealthy New York people. Its members were friends of Peary.
The idea of establishing the club had been put forward by Morris K. Jesup in the spring 1897. One year after the foundation, Morris Jesup was elected in 1899 as the first president of the club. Henry W. Cannon became treasurer, Herbert Bridgman secretary and Frederick E. Hyde vice-president. Judge Charles P. Daly, president of the American Geographical Society was elected to the executive committee of the club.

In 1904, the club was able to raise funds to buy Peary a ship for his expeditions, the SS Roosevelt. The club's fundraising included generous gifts of $50,000 from George Crocker, the youngest son of banker Charles Crocker, and $25,000 from Morris K. Jesup. 

Following Morris Jesup's death in 1908, Thomas Hubbard was named president of the club and Zenas Crane was given the post of vice-president. The club was extinguished after Peary's death in 1920.

Prominent members
Herbert L. Bridgman
Henry W. Cannon
Thomas Hamlin Hubbard
E. C. Benedict
E. W. Bliss
Charles P. Daly
James J. Hill
Henry H. Benedict
Frederick E. Hyde
John M. Flagler
H. Hayden Sands
James M. Constable
Clarence F. Wyckoff 
Edward G. Wyckoff
Henry Parish
A. A. Raven
Grant B. Schley
Eben B. Thomas
James W. Davidson

Honors
A number of geographic features in Greenland and Canada were named after members of the club, including:

Benedict Fjord
Bliss Bay
Cape Bridgman
Cape Cannon
Cape Henry Parish
Cape James Hill
Cape John Flagler
Cape Morris Jesup, the northernmost point of Greenland
Cape Thomas Hubbard
Cape Wyckoff
Constable Bay
Daly Range
Frederick E. Hyde Fjord
G. B. Schley Fjord
H. H. Benedict Range
Judge Daly Promontory
Morris Jesup Glacier
Mount Daly
Mount Davidson
Mount Henry Parish
Mount Schley
Mount Wyckoff
Raven Glacier
Sands Fjord
Thomas Glacier
Wyckoff Island
Wyckoff Land

Bibliography
Robert E. Peary, Nearest the Pole: A Narrative of the Polar Expedition of the Peary Arctic Club in the S. S. Roosevelt, 1905 -1906.
Robert E. Peary, The North Pole (Illustrated)
Peary Arctic Club : objects of the club, plan of campaign, description of new ship. Lotus Press, New York. 1905
North Polar Exploration: Field Work of the Peary Arctic Club 1898-1902, Scientific American, 1904

References

External links
Iceberg. Peary Arctic Club Relief Expedition of 1901
Discovery of the North Pole, Chapter 28
Marie Peary Stafford's Journal
Departure of the "Windward" - JSTOR
 Peary Arctic Club's North Polar Expedition Photo Album at Dartmouth College Library
Organizations established in 1898
Organizations based in New York City
Clubs and societies in New York City
1898 establishments in New York City